Zhijiang is a county-level city of Yichang City, in the west of Hubei province, People's Republic of China. Until the 1990s Zhijiang was a county. It is located on the left (northern) shore of the Yangtze River, downstream from Yichang center city.

Administrative divisions
One subdistrict:
Majiadian Subdistrict

Eight towns:

Climate

Zhijiang has a humid subtropical climate (Köppen climate classification Cfa) with hot, rainy summers and cool winters. Rainfall occurs throughout the year but is significantly heavier between April and August.

Education 
 Zhijiang High School

Transport 
China National Highway 318
 Yichang Sanxia Airport
 Jiaozuo–Liuzhou Railway

Lü Banglie 
In October 2005, Zhijiang was in the news because one of the delegates to its (county-level) People's Congress, Lu Banglie, a village-rights activist, was savagely beaten on October 8, 2005 in the village of Taishi, in Yuwotou town, Panyu District, Guangzhou, Guangdong, by unknown persons. The beating was witnessed by Benjamin Joffe-Walt, correspondent for The Guardian newspaper of the UK, who was himself threatened and believed Lü had been killed.

He is the first elected village head in the history of the People's Republic of China.

The beating may have been intended to prevent a similar popular election from taking place in Taishi.

External links

County-level divisions of Hubei
Cities in Hubei
Geography of Yichang
Populated places on the Yangtze River